Winarni Binti Slamet (born December 19, 1975) is an Indonesian weightlifter who competed in the women's 53 kg at the 2000 Summer Olympics and won the bronze medal, lifting 202.5 kg in total. Also she won the World Championship in 1997.

Notes and references

External links

Weightlifters at the 2000 Summer Olympics
Olympic weightlifters of Indonesia
Olympic bronze medalists for Indonesia
1975 births
Living people
Olympic medalists in weightlifting
Indonesian female weightlifters
Weightlifters at the 1998 Asian Games
Medalists at the 2000 Summer Olympics
Asian Games competitors for Indonesia
People from Semarang
World Weightlifting Championships medalists
20th-century Indonesian women
21st-century Indonesian women